Schwarzsee (literally "Black Lake") is a mountain lake at an elevation of 2368 m on the Pizol mountain (2844 m) of the Glarus Alps.

Lakes of Switzerland
Lakes of the canton of St. Gallen
LSchwarzsee